The 1964–65 New York Rangers season was the franchise's 39th season. In the regular season, the Rangers posted a 20–38–12 record, and missed the NHL playoffs with a fifth-place finish.

Regular season
On January 27, 1965, Ulf Sterner, the first European trained player, made his debut in the National Hockey League for the New York Rangers in a game versus the Boston Bruins.

Final standings

Record vs. opponents

Schedule and results

|- align="center" bgcolor="#CCFFCC"
| 1 || 12 || @ Boston Bruins || 6–2 || 1–0–0
|- align="center" bgcolor="#FFBBBB"
| 2 || 13 || Montreal Canadiens || 3–0 || 1–1–0
|- align="center" bgcolor="white"
| 3 || 17 || @ Montreal Canadiens || 2–2 || 1–1–1
|- align="center" bgcolor="white"
| 4 || 18 || Toronto Maple Leafs || 3–3 || 1–1–2
|- align="center" bgcolor="#FFBBBB"
| 5 || 21 || Detroit Red Wings || 1–0 || 1–2–2
|- align="center" bgcolor="white"
| 6 || 24 || @ Toronto Maple Leafs || 1–1 || 1–2–3
|- align="center" bgcolor="#FFBBBB"
| 7 || 25 || Chicago Black Hawks || 5–2 || 1–3–3
|- align="center" bgcolor="#CCFFCC"
| 8 || 28 || Boston Bruins || 3–1 || 2–3–3
|-

|- align="center" bgcolor="#CCFFCC"
| 9 || 1 || Montreal Canadiens || 3–1 || 3–3–3
|- align="center" bgcolor="#FFBBBB"
| 10 || 3 || @ Chicago Black Hawks || 2–1 || 3–4–3
|- align="center" bgcolor="#FFBBBB"
| 11 || 5 || @ Detroit Red Wings || 3–1 || 3–5–3
|- align="center" bgcolor="#CCFFCC"
| 12 || 7 || @ Toronto Maple Leafs || 1–0 || 4–5–3
|- align="center" bgcolor="#CCFFCC"
| 13 || 11 || Boston Bruins || 4–2 || 5–5–3
|- align="center" bgcolor="#FFBBBB"
| 14 || 15 || Detroit Red Wings || 6–2 || 5–6–3
|- align="center" bgcolor="#CCFFCC"
| 15 || 17 || @ Detroit Red Wings || 2–1 || 6–6–3
|- align="center" bgcolor="white"
| 16 || 22 || Detroit Red Wings || 3–3 || 6–6–4
|- align="center" bgcolor="#CCFFCC"
| 17 || 25 || Toronto Maple Leafs || 6–3 || 7–6–4
|- align="center" bgcolor="#FFBBBB"
| 18 || 26 || @ Boston Bruins || 6–1 || 7–7–4
|- align="center" bgcolor="#CCFFCC"
| 19 || 28 || @ Toronto Maple Leafs || 4–1 || 8–7–4
|- align="center" bgcolor="#FFBBBB"
| 20 || 29 || Montreal Canadiens || 5–2 || 8–8–4
|-

|- align="center" bgcolor="white"
| 21 || 2 || Chicago Black Hawks || 3–3 || 8–8–5
|- align="center" bgcolor="white"
| 22 || 5 || @ Boston Bruins || 3–3 || 8–8–6
|- align="center" bgcolor="#CCFFCC"
| 23 || 6 || @ Chicago Black Hawks || 4–1 || 9–8–6
|- align="center" bgcolor="#FFBBBB"
| 24 || 9 || Chicago Black Hawks || 6–1 || 9–9–6
|- align="center" bgcolor="#FFBBBB"
| 25 || 12 || @ Montreal Canadiens || 7–1 || 9–10–6
|- align="center" bgcolor="white"
| 26 || 13 || Toronto Maple Leafs || 3–3 || 9–10–7
|- align="center" bgcolor="#FFBBBB"
| 27 || 16 || Detroit Red Wings || 7–3 || 9–11–7
|- align="center" bgcolor="#FFBBBB"
| 28 || 19 || @ Toronto Maple Leafs || 6–3 || 9–12–7
|- align="center" bgcolor="#FFBBBB"
| 29 || 20 || Montreal Canadiens || 3–2 || 9–13–7
|- align="center" bgcolor="#FFBBBB"
| 30 || 23 || @ Montreal Canadiens || 2–0 || 9–14–7
|- align="center" bgcolor="#CCFFCC"
| 31 || 25 || @ Boston Bruins || 3–0 || 10–14–7
|- align="center" bgcolor="#FFBBBB"
| 32 || 26 || Boston Bruins || 2–0 || 10–15–7
|- align="center" bgcolor="#FFBBBB"
| 33 || 27 || @ Detroit Red Wings || 3–1 || 10–16–7
|- align="center" bgcolor="#FFBBBB"
| 34 || 29 || Chicago Black Hawks || 4–2 || 10–17–7
|-

|- align="center" bgcolor="#FFBBBB"
| 35 || 1 || @ Chicago Black Hawks || 2–1 || 10–18–7
|- align="center" bgcolor="white"
| 36 || 3 || Toronto Maple Leafs || 3–3 || 10–18–8
|- align="center" bgcolor="#CCFFCC"
| 37 || 6 || Boston Bruins || 5–2 || 11–18–8
|- align="center" bgcolor="#CCFFCC"
| 38 || 9 || @ Montreal Canadiens || 6–5 || 12–18–8
|- align="center" bgcolor="#FFBBBB"
| 39 || 10 || Toronto Maple Leafs || 6–0 || 12–19–8
|- align="center" bgcolor="#FFBBBB"
| 40 || 14 || @ Boston Bruins || 5–2 || 12–20–8
|- align="center" bgcolor="#CCFFCC"
| 41 || 16 || @ Chicago Black Hawks || 6–3 || 13–20–8
|- align="center" bgcolor="#CCFFCC"
| 42 || 17 || @ Detroit Red Wings || 4–2 || 14–20–8
|- align="center" bgcolor="white"
| 43 || 23 || @ Toronto Maple Leafs || 1–1 || 14–20–9
|- align="center" bgcolor="#FFBBBB"
| 44 || 24 || @ Chicago Black Hawks || 7–2 || 14–21–9
|- align="center" bgcolor="#CCFFCC"
| 45 || 27 || Boston Bruins || 5–2 || 15–21–9
|- align="center" bgcolor="#FFBBBB"
| 46 || 30 || @ Montreal Canadiens || 5–1 || 15–22–9
|- align="center" bgcolor="#FFBBBB"
| 47 || 31 || Detroit Red Wings || 4–1 || 15–23–9
|-

|- align="center" bgcolor="#FFBBBB"
| 48 || 3 || Chicago Black Hawks || 4–1 || 15–24–9
|- align="center" bgcolor="#FFBBBB"
| 49 || 6 || @ Boston Bruins || 3–2 || 15–25–9
|- align="center" bgcolor="#CCFFCC"
| 50 || 7 || Boston Bruins || 8–3 || 16–25–9
|- align="center" bgcolor="#FFBBBB"
| 51 || 13 || Chicago Black Hawks || 3–0 || 16–26–9
|- align="center" bgcolor="#FFBBBB"
| 52 || 14 || @ Detroit Red Wings || 6–2 || 16–27–9
|- align="center" bgcolor="#FFBBBB"
| 53 || 17 || @ Chicago Black Hawks || 5–4 || 16–28–9
|- align="center" bgcolor="#FFBBBB"
| 54 || 20 || @ Detroit Red Wings || 3–2 || 16–29–9
|- align="center" bgcolor="white"
| 55 || 21 || Montreal Canadiens || 2–2 || 16–29–10
|- align="center" bgcolor="#FFBBBB"
| 56 || 24 || @ Montreal Canadiens || 6–1 || 16–30–10
|- align="center" bgcolor="#CCFFCC"
| 57 || 27 || @ Toronto Maple Leafs || 4–3 || 17–30–10
|- align="center" bgcolor="#CCFFCC"
| 58 || 28 || Toronto Maple Leafs || 6–2 || 18–30–10
|-

|- align="center" bgcolor="#FFBBBB"
| 59 || 3 || Boston Bruins || 6–1 || 18–31–10
|- align="center" bgcolor="#CCFFCC"
| 60 || 4 || @ Boston Bruins || 4–3 || 19–31–10
|- align="center" bgcolor="#FFBBBB"
| 61 || 6 || @ Montreal Canadiens || 2–1 || 19–32–10
|- align="center" bgcolor="#FFBBBB"
| 62 || 7 || Detroit Red Wings || 6–5 || 19–33–10
|- align="center" bgcolor="white"
| 63 || 10 || Chicago Black Hawks || 1–1 || 19–33–11
|- align="center" bgcolor="#FFBBBB"
| 64 || 14 || Montreal Canadiens || 6–4 || 19–34–11
|- align="center" bgcolor="white"
| 65 || 19 || Detroit Red Wings || 6–6 || 19–34–12
|- align="center" bgcolor="#FFBBBB"
| 66 || 20 || @ Toronto Maple Leafs || 4–1 || 19–35–12
|- align="center" bgcolor="#FFBBBB"
| 67 || 21 || Toronto Maple Leafs || 10–1 || 19–36–12
|- align="center" bgcolor="#CCFFCC"
| 68 || 23 || @ Chicago Black Hawks || 3–2 || 20–36–12
|- align="center" bgcolor="#FFBBBB"
| 69 || 25 || @ Detroit Red Wings || 7–4 || 20–37–12
|- align="center" bgcolor="#FFBBBB"
| 70 || 28 || Montreal Canadiens || 5–3 || 20–38–12
|-

Playoffs
The Rangers failed to qualify for the 1965 Stanley Cup playoffs.

Player statistics
Skaters

Goaltenders

†Denotes player spent time with another team before joining Rangers. Stats reflect time with Rangers only.
‡Traded mid-season. Stats reflect time with Rangers only.

Awards and records

Transactions

Draft picks
New York's picks at the 1964 NHL Amateur Draft in Montreal, Quebec, Canada.

Farm teams

See also
1964–65 NHL season

References

New York Rangers seasons
New York Rangers
New York Rangers
New York Rangers
New York Rangers
Madison Square Garden
1960s in Manhattan